The End of the World News is a 1982 novel by British author Anthony Burgess.

Presented without chapter breaks, the plot weaves together three storylines. One follows Leon Trotsky on a journey to New York City shortly before the Russian Revolution of 1917. This story is written as the libretto of an Off-Broadway musical. A second tale covers the life and career of Sigmund Freud and includes portrayals of Havelock Ellis and Krafft-Ebing. The third part is set in the future, shortly before the impact of a rogue, extrasolar planet with the Earth. Because of the latter story line, it is considered a work of fantastic fiction.

Plot

Sigmund Freud

In 1896 as Sigmund Freud and family are vacationing in The French Alps, Freud receives a telegram informing him that his father has died. At the funeral, he is openly criticized by members of his own extended family when they learn of the often invasive and sexual nature of his work.  Freud is gaining momentum as a psychoanalyst with many believing him to be a genius but other dismissing him as a lunatic. One of his colleagues Dr Meynert dismisses psychoanalysis as a pseudo science and believes that the kindest thing to do for patients suffering from paranoia and manic depression would be to execute them. Professor Nothnegal sends Freud a patient who does not want to submit to his psychoanalytical methods. Freud suspect’s that Nothnegal has assigned him this patient in order to see him fail publicly but Freud preservers and eventually the patient talks and is cured of his ailments. Freud’s book “The Interpretation of Dreams” starts to sell very well. Freud is befriended by Havelock Ellis who tells him that although he has a fine grasp on psychoanalysis he believes there are many more secrets to discovered and proposes the two work together. Their work is successful and Freud soon discovers that the need for psychoanalysis has been passed by 90% of the French Parliament. Freud Starts a discussion group with Alfred Adler and a group of other physicians some of whom disagree with his particular methods. One day they are joined by another psychoanalyst and a fan of Freud, Carl Jung. Although initially harmonious, the group quickly starts to crumble when Adler claims that Jung is an anti-semite. At this time Freud is diagnosed with cancer of the mouth but perseveres with his work. Freud disagrees with the direction Adler takes their club and is ostracized from it for claiming Adler is a biologist and not qualified to indulge in psychoanalysis. Freud is soon warmed by colleagues that the Nazi party do not approve of his particular strand of psychoanalysis, specifically because he is a Jew. Dr. Jones from Britain arrives in Vienna and tries to persuade Freud to leave with him but Freud refuses, comparing it to an officer leaving a sinking ship. That night The Gestapo turns up at Freud’s home and takes his daughter Anna for interrogation and to question her use of psychoanalytical work with children, believing her to be brainwashing you German youth. They let Anna go but instruct her to return first thing in the morning every day for further questioning. For Freud, this bullying of his daughter plus his deteriorating health prove to be the final straw and he accepts Jones’ offer to leave for Britain. However, as one final act of embarrassment Freud is told by the Gestapo that he will have to sign an official Nazi document stating that he has been treated with nothing but respect by the party before he is allowed to leave which he reluctantly does. Word of Freud’s view that every psychoanalytical disorder can in some way be attributed to sex does not sit well with the medical school of Vienna but Freud goes ahead and insists on publishing his latest book which is used by the Nazi’s as evidence of the “sickness” of the Jewish mind which leads to one final public humiliation before he leaves Vienna.

Trotsky’s In New York

Leon Trotsky is in New York and commissions a young woman named Olga to transcribe Trotsky musings into a manuscript. Trotsky upsets numerous New York natives by expressing doubt about the will of the American worker and laughing at the idea that all men are created equal. As he is transcribing a piece he mentioned that he believes that the Americans are silly for “wasting millions of dollars on a useless war”. Olga writes simply “war” but Trotsky emphasizes that he specified a “useless war”. As Trotsky pontificates to Olga, she eventually grows tired of what she suspects to be lies and believes that once a substantial number of his followers begin to question his world view he will cast them aside. Olga leaves and Trotsky, though angry confesses he finds himself attracted to her due to her assertiveness. During a public talk by Trotsky, a New York politician named Ernst Schnitzler announces that an American submarine has been sunk and tries to start a riot but Trotsky denies that such a submarine existed. Trotsky is bullied by the American working class who resent him telling them how to run their country. One night he narrowly avoids being beaten by a gang of New York street thugs and he decides to leave after he hears that a revolution has taken place in his home country.

The End of the World

Valentine Broadie is a high school literature teacher. His students are frightened by rumours on the news of a comet known as Lynx headed towards earth which Valentine dismisses as mere science fiction. On his way home from work Valentine saves a department store Santa named Willet from being beaten by a gang of youths and the two share a drink in a bar. While watching the television it’s announced that the comet is indeed headed towards earth. Plans are made to evacuate as many people from the Earth as possible in a giant spacecraft known as "Tallis". One of the men in charge of the escape is Professor Frame who is the father of Valentine’s wife Vanessa. Although Frame and his partner Bartlett proclaim that the ship will be filled with as many people as possible, they actually plan to fill it with only fifty, each one being the best expert in their respective field of expertise as they believe that they will be the only people needed to repopulate the globe and prove the most useful if they discover a new world. After learning that married couples will not be allowed on board Tallis, Vanessa arranges to divorce her husband so that he will get a place on the ship based on his own merits. Valentine initially refuses after discovering that innocent manual laborers will be used to construct the ship not knowing they will not be allowed on board. However he reluctantly accepts when he learns that he will either be executed or forced to join the construction crew if he reveals this to anyone. Panic starts to overtake the planet and Frame and Bartlett double cross Val by stealing his authorization pass so that he can not board the plane to Tallis. They tell Vanessa that he was murdered by hysterical thugs. Val and Willet accept their fate and go to a fancy New York hotel and spend all their collective money in the best suite and the finest food. On board the ship a passenger named Nat Goya tells Bartlett that his computers have made a mistake as he is a married man with a child in the way. He tells Bartlett that if his wife is not allowed on board then he wants to leave but Bartlett refuses as Goya is the world’s best micro-agronomist. Goya escapes the ship in a truck but is recaptured and executed. The next morning New York is devastated by thunder, hurricanes and rising sea levels as Lynx approaches the Earth. Valentine and Willet stumble upon one of Willet’s old books where he predicted that the safest place in America in the cause of a catastrophe such as this would be in Kansas and so they spend the next few months travelling there. On board Tallis, Frame confesses that he did not allow Valentine on the ship and commits suicide out of guilt. This causes an uprising and Bartlett is killed by the other passengers. Bartlett’s understudy Calvin Gropius takes control of the ship and flies it to Kansas after learning it is one of the few American states still left intact. Upon landing Valentine is reunited with Vanessa. After packing the ship with as many survivors as possible Willet decides that he will not board the ship with his friend and will instead stay behind, believing that the Earth will not be completely devastated by the comet and keen to help with the rebuilding and recovery. Before the ship takes off Willet gifts Valentine with audio discs of two radio plays he once played small acting roles in: “Freud” and “Trotsky’s in New York”. After a ceremonial playing of Mozart’s Jupiter Symphony, the ship takes off to seek a new world.

Epilogue

The book ends some time after the evacuation of Earth with a teacher named Valentine O'Grady asking his class full of young students their thoughts on the stories he has just told them. However he discovers to his annoyance that they clearly were not paying attention, evidenced by the fact that they immediately refer to Sigmund Freud as "Fred Freud" and Trotsky as "Trot Sky". The school bell rings and the students hastily leave the classroom, having already forgotten what O'Grady was trying to tell them.

Reception

Reviewing the book for The New York Times, Anatole Broyard concluded that "Mr. Burgess might have written a very good science-fiction novel if he had been more interested in entertaining the reader rather than himself."

References

1982 British novels
Novels by Anthony Burgess
Cultural depictions of Leon Trotsky
Cultural depictions of Sigmund Freud
Hutchinson (publisher) books
Novels about impact events